The Fortescue National Football League, named after the Fortescue River, is an Australian rules football competition based in the Pilbara region of Western Australia.  It features three clubs (Panthers, Tigers, Townsite Eagles) from the town of Tom Price and one (Saints) from Paraburdoo.  It was founded in 1970.

The league is affiliated with the West Australian Football Commission through the Western Australian Country Football League.

History 

Australian Rules football commenced in Tom Price with a social game between workers in the Pit ( Mine area) and Crushing and Screening area in late 1969 or early 1970. Following the success of that game, an informal meeting was held at a residence in Willow Road to proceed with the establishment of a competition. A further meeting was held to formally establish the structure of the committee and guidelines for conducting the competition along with delegation areas from which the teams were to be derived from.

At this meeting Ted Routley was elected the inaugural president, Max Tredrea secretary and Ben Jenke treasurer. The teams were to be composed of players who worked in the respective work areas of the Mining operations. i.e., The Hill Football club was composed of players who worked in the actual pit area, Crushers from the Crushing and Screening and rail operations, Centrals from the Mine administration, workshop and supply areas and Towns employees from town services staff, banks, post office, catering, airlines and retail establishments. Colin (Poppa) Bielski, Hamersley Irons’ popular Liaison Officer (who knew almost nothing of Australian Football) was duly appointed patron and donated the Bielski Medal for the best fairest and best player in the competition. Ben Jenke, the inaugural treasurer was the first umpire, being the only one with any experience.

The competition was initially known as the Fortescue National Football Association, but later removed the word “Association” and replaced it with “League”. 

Only one game could be played each week due to the oval, which by now had a beautiful covering of grass, being shared with teams from other sporting codes. Therefore, each team played a game every two weeks. Two sets of Guernseys were purchased by Max Tredrea, one being gold with blue trimmings and the other blue with gold trimmings. Hill, later that season, purchased a set of Guernseys of their own based on West Perth colours. Initial coaches were Townsite - Ray Farrelly, Paul Pouncett - Crushers (now Tigers), David Prime - Centrals (later merged with Hill to form Panthers) and Peter Passamani - Hill.

Winners of the first game played were Townsite who went through the season undefeated only to narrowly lose the Grand Final to Hill. The inaugural Bielski medal winner was Des Routley (the president's son) from Townsite. The reopening of Hamersley Irons’ Paraburdoo operations in 1973 saw a team named Saints from Paraburdoo entering the competition and winning the premiership in their first year, repeating it in 1976 after being runners-up in 1974 to Centrals. Another team from Paraburdoo, Demons, entered the competition in 1974 bringing to a total of six clubs. In 1973 Fortescue entered a team in the ‘C’ Section of the Wesfarmers Country Championships winning the Section. However 1974 in B Section of the championships the League was unsuccessful.

The inaugural BP Championships was held in Mt Newman in 1976 for North West Leagues and was won by Fortescue who went on to repeat their success in 1978 and 1979 They were runners up in 1977 and 1980.

In 1979 Ken Turner, Russell Schumacher, Reg Dube’ and Alan Stott with cooperation from Bob Cramer and others provided financial assistance to purchase premises to establish the Crushers Football and Sporting Club. A liquor licence was obtained and the club was duly established. This trend was adopted by other clubs in the competition with Towns and Demons following soon after.

This move established Crushers football team, by now known as Tigers as formidable force in the competition, winning their first premiership in 1983 (coached by Geoff Baldock) and repeating it in 1984. The 1984 Grand final was the first played in Paraburdoo with Demons and Tigers clashing. Demons were to taste success in 1985

There were many outstanding footballers that missed out on winning the Bielski. These included Don Newman, Clem Thompson, Drew Schapel, Ray Sellars, Leon Warren, Robert Foan, David Jackson and Barry Peters. David Maher from the Tigers played 311 league and combined games during his stellar career with the club, spanning seventeen seasons and capping his career off by winning two Bielski Medals.

Les Becker was at the helm of the League's combined sides in the 1970,s, coaching it to three BP Championship wins. He also coached with success at Centrals and later went on to coach Tigers.

Charlie Salmon also coached Tigers for a number years culminating in a premiership in 1989. He went on to coach Pioneers in the Newman National Football, rising to become President of that league and also umpiring. He, sadly, like so many of the people who contributed to football in the North is no longer with us passing away in unfortunate circumstances and laid to rest with the 1989 premiership flag at his side. The umpiring fraternity must also be mentioned for their contribution with Marty Tompkins being one who gave the league excellent service during his long career. Barry Peters, Ben Jenke, Barley Bogar, Chris Clowser, Roger Nancarrow, David Schumacher, Lance White, Terry Hutton, Bob Foan and Colin Cooke (umpire and convenor today), all giving valuable service in the middle.

The league tribunals always had more twists than a Perry Mason courtroom with many players believing they had been wronged, claiming to have a better knowledge of the rules than the esteemed members of the panel. Kevin Hagan, the local Justice of Peace sat regularly on tribunals and quickly earned the reputation of “The Hanging Judge”. One player was overheard to have said that he “would rather go to the gallows than front the Judge”. He would often request that “the guilty party” be brought in to have his case heard. Compared to other leagues the Fortescue is a “young” league, but during its existence it has had its share of controversy, tribulations and successes. It has always been fortunate that there were good administrators and people with sound judgement to guide it through turbulent times.

The league has had players from all states and nationalities spread throughout the clubs over the years. A survey carried out during the mid seventies revealed that over eighty per cent of the players originated from outside of Western Australia.

Australian Football since its inception 1970 in Tom Price has broken down divisions that had emanated in the workplace and many new friendships were created across the working environment in the region. Passion generated from the introduction of football brought the towns to life once the season started creating a healthy rivalry.

Hamersley Iron Pty Ltd (now Rio Tinto) and the Shire of Ashburton must be acknowledged for the provision and maintenance of the wonderful facilities that football in the communities enjoy.

The league congratulates the Country Football League for its initiative in compiling the publication and trust it will receive wide acclaim from football lovers.  In conclusion recognition must be given to those who have acknowledged the final siren and sadly are not with us today. Memories of your involvement are treasured and contributions held sincerely in high esteem. You are not forgotten.

In the 2011 season forward Simon Ponter, playing for Paraburdoo, set a new all-time league record, kicking 106 goals in 11 matches. He became the first player in league history to kick 100 goals in a season. He kicked 18 goals in a single game against the Tom Prices Tigers in June 2011. 

In the 2022 season Guy Lawson, playing for the Tom Price Tigers managed to kick 0 goals for the season despite being primarily a forward.

By Adrian Marshall:
Adrian worked with MMA at Tom Price in 1970, was involved in organising the inaugural competition and played with Towns.  He left within a few years but returned to Paraburdoo when that project started around 1973.
The Pilbara Championship Fairest & Best Player Medal is named after him.

Current clubs

Former clubs

Grand final results

References

External links
 Fortescue National Football League at australianrulesfootball.com.au
 Fortescue National Football League at aussierulesinternational.com

Australian rules football competitions in Western Australia
Sports leagues established in 1971
Sport in Pilbara